Lar River is a river of northern Iran, in the province of Mazandaran. It flows through the Alborz mountain range, and is a tributary of the Haraz River.

Rivers of Mazandaran Province
Alborz (mountain range)
Tributaries of the Haraz River